In the Roman Empire during Late Antiquity, the adventus was a ceremony held to celebrate the arrival at a city of a Roman emperor or other dignitaries. The imperial adventus was the period's "ceremonial par excellence", celebrating both the emperor's arrival and the blessing of the imperial presence itself on the city's security. The term is also used to refer to artistic depictions (usually in relief sculpture, including coins) of such ceremonies.

The city would be decorated for the occasion, a public procession would come out of the city to meet and welcome the honorand on the road, and after ritually escorting them into town, a panegyric would be delivered in their honour, followed by a festival and games. Its 'opposite' was the profectio. Besides the emperors, governors of the Roman provinces and bishops could be received by an adventus.

For an emperor, especially one having newly acceded or usurped power, celebrating an adventus confirmed the legitimacy of the ruler, demonstrating the consent of the governed city's people, and the events were reproduced and symbolized in imperial iconography and art. From the time of Constantine the Great's arrival in Rome after defeating his rival Augustus Maxentius at the Battle of the Milvian Bridge, the adventus ceremonies of the emperors took on characteristics of the Roman triumph and were associated with the triumphal entry into Jerusalem by Jesus of Nazareth described in the gospels of the New Testament. Christian relics were sometimes also honoured with an adventus ceremony during a translation to a city.

The  ( or ) consisted of the ritual procession to meet the approaching honorand on the road; the size, composition, and distance from the city of the welcoming party was determined by the guest's rank and status. The delivery of panegyric in honour of the occasion and in praise of the arrival was an enduring fixture, as were acclamations, hymns, poetry, music, lights, decorations and incense. Religious shrines would be visited en route, and afterwards a banquet was probably held. 

For comparable ceremonies in Medieval and Early Modern Europe, sometimes employing consciously 'Roman' iconology, see royal entry.

See also
Parousia
Advent

References

External links
Panel Reliefs of Marcus Aurelius and Roman Imperial Iconography

Processions in ancient Rome
Roman Empire sculptures
Military of ancient Rome
Ceremonies